Brühl or Bruhl is a surname. Notable people with the surname include:

 Alois Friedrich von Brühl (1739–1793), Polish-Saxon diplomat, politician, soldier, actor and playwright
 Carl Brühl (1820–1899), Austrian physician and anatomist
 Carl von Brühl (1772–1837), German theater manager
 Carlrichard Brühl (1925–1997), German historian of medieval history and philatelist
 Daniel Brühl (b. 1978), German actor
 Friedrich-August Graf von Brühl (1913–1981), German Major in the Wehrmacht, Oberstleutnant in the Bundeswehr
 Gabriel Brühl (died 1743), robber in the then Duchy of Limburg
 Gustav Brühl (1871–1939), German otorhinolaryngologist
 Gustav Brühl (author) (1826–1903), United States physician, poet and archaeologist
 Hans Moritz von Brühl (1736–1809), German diplomat and astronomer also known as John Maurice, Count of Brühl
 Heidi Brühl (1942–1991), German singer and actress
 Heinrich von Brühl (1700–1763), German statesman
 Helmut Müller-Brühl (1933–2012), German conductor
 Jeremy James Bruhl (b. 1956), Australian botanist
 Lucien Lévy-Bruhl (1857–1939), French scholar
 Louis Burleigh Bruhl (1861–1942), English landscape artist
 Marie von Brühl (1739–1836), wife and assistant to Carl von Clausewitz
 Paul Johannes Brühl (1855-1935), botanist